Vilminore di Scalve is a comune (municipality) in the Province of Bergamo in the Italian region of Lombardy, located about  northeast of Milan and about  northeast of Bergamo.

The municipality of Vilminore di Scalve contains the frazioni (subdivisions, mainly villages and hamlets) Vilmaggiore, S. Andrea, Dezzolo, Bueggio, Nona, Pezzolo, Pianezza, and Teveno.

Vilminore di Scalve borders the following municipalities: Azzone, Colere, Gromo, Oltressenda Alta, Rovetta, Schilpario, Teglio, Valbondione.

Demographic evolution

References

External links
 www.comune.vilminore.bg.it/